The HF S10 is a camcorder released by Canon in February 2009.

Camera 
This is the first camcorder in Canon's HF S lineup. It supersedes the Canon HF 11 and is succeeded by the Canon HF S11. It has a new video snapshot mode, and an improved UI. Also onboard is an enhanced Digic DV III processor.

Specifications 

 8.59 megapixels CMOS sensor
 DIGIC DV III processor
 AVCHD progressive/interlaced
 Up to 1080i at 50fps/60fps and 1080p at 24fps/25fps
 Includes BP-807 battery, upgradeable to BP-819 or BP-827
 Released: February 2009
 Price: approx. $2500 AUD

References 

Cameras